= Muhammad Kader Hawdeyani =

Iraqi Kurdish politician

Muhammad Kader Hawdeyani is an Iraqi Kurdish politician and Minister for Social Affairs for the Kurdistan Regional Government.

In July 2014, after visiting prisons in Iraqi Kurdistan, he reported that "Due to the influx of thousands of refugees from Syria and other parts of Iraq, the amount of crime and arrests have increased," and that the number of prisoners had increased. He called on security forces to make a greater effort to keep the crime rate from rising.
